This article describes 23 gates of Belgrade.

Roman gates
Remains of southeastern gate of the Singidunum's castrum were found when adapting the building of the Belgrade Library, with one of its towers now being in the library depot and the other across the street in the small park with Milan Rakić's bust. Thus this entrance stayed at the same place for nearly 2,000 years.

Northwestern gate of the castrum was located roughly at the same place as today's Defterdar's Gate.

Fortress gates

Upper city gates
These are gates in the walls of the Upper City of the Belgrade Fortress. Gates that are connected to each other are not exactly aligned. This was done to prevent use of siege engines on the inner gate, if the outer gate would be breached.

Lower city gates

Outer city gates
When Austrians occupied northern Serbia, including Belgrade, in the early 18the century, apart from rebuilding and renovating the Fortress, they dug a moat outside of the Fortress, as the first line of defense. It became known as the "Laudan trench" (Serbian Laudanov šanac or simply Šanac). It was up to 6 meters wide, 2 meters deep and on the outer side  had reinforcements in the form of earth embankments or walls. In order to get to and out of the city, a system of many gates and bridges was built through and on the trench. They all had a permanent military crew and were always locked at night. These outer city gates were demolished from 1862 to 1866, together with the outer city wall they were in. Commemorative plaques mark their former locations now.

Modern gates

References

External links

Tourist attractions in Belgrade
History of Belgrade
Belgrade
Lists of coordinates
Lists of buildings and structures in Belgrade
Ottoman clock towers